Dragon Ball is a Japanese media franchise created by Akira Toriyama in 1984. Since 1986, there have been 24 theatrical films based on the franchise, including twenty-one anime films produced by Toei Animation, two unofficial films and one official live-action film.

Background

Original run (1986–1996)

During the franchise's original broadcast run (1986-1997), Toei produced Dragon Ball films rapidly, often two a year to match the Japanese spring and summer vacations. Seventeen films were produced in this period—three Dragon Ball films from 1986 to 1988, thirteen Dragon Ball Z films from 1989 to 1995, and finally a tenth anniversary film that was released in 1996 and adapted the Red Ribbon arc of the original series. These films have a running time below feature length (around 45–60 minutes each) except for the 1996 film, at 80 minutes. These films were mostly alternate retellings of certain story arcs involving new characters or extra side-stories that do not correlate with the same continuity as the manga or TV series.

These were generally screened back to back with other Toei films for that season as special theatrical events in Japan.

While the majority of these films were only screened in Japan, Dragon Ball Z: The Return of Cooler (1992) and Dragon Ball Z: Fusion Reborn (1995) were both screened in the United States in 2006 to promote Fusion Reborns dubbed DVD release that year.

Live-action film (2009)
A single live-action adaptation of the series was released in 2009, Dragonball Evolution. It received a 15% approval rating on Rotten Tomatoes, with an average rating of 3.5/10, amid whitewashing. A number of sequels to Evolution were planned—with lead Justin Chatwin signed on for three films. He expressed interest in seven films in interview. However due to the film’s failure, none of these sequels were ever produced. The rights to any further live action films are currently owned by the Walt Disney Company, after their acquisition of 20th Century Fox.

Evolution remains the only licensed live-action film, though two unlicensed films were released in the early 1990s.

Animated revival (2013–present)

The franchise returned with Dragon Ball Z: Battle of Gods (2013), the first animated film since 1996, and the first produced with Toriyama's involvement. The film—a sequel to the original series—became the franchise's most successful at the time. Unlike the classic event circuit films, those from 2013 onwards were developed with an international theatrical release planned from the beginning, under 20th Century Fox, now owned by The Walt Disney Company. Battle of Gods was followed by Dragon Ball Z: Resurrection 'F' in 2015. The second film introduced Jaco to Dragon Ball, a character which had debuted in Toriyama's spin-off manga Jaco the Galactic Patrolman in 2013. These two movies were adapted by the Dragon Ball Super TV series, with the plotlines from the two films forming multi-episode arcs early in the show's broadcast.

Later movies would adopt the Super moniker, beginning with Dragon Ball Super: Broly (2018) which grossed more than  worldwide, and is—as of June 2020—the 12th highest-grossing anime film of all time. The most recently released two films, Resurrection 'F''' and Broly, both hold an 82% approval rating on Rotten Tomatoes. A second Super film, Dragon Ball Super: Super Hero, was released in 2022.

Films

Animated

Live-action

 Reception 

In commemoration of the release of the 20th film, an official online poll asked 6,000 Japanese fans to pick their favorite film in the franchise. The top five films were (from first to fifth): Dragon Ball Z: Fusion Reborn, Dragon Ball Z: Battle of Gods, Dragon Ball Z: Broly – The Legendary Super Saiyan, Dragon Ball Z: Resurrection 'F', Dragon Ball Z: The Return of Cooler.

 Box office performance 

{| class="wikitable sortable plainrowheaders" style="text-align:center;"
! scope="col" rowspan="2" | Film
! scope="col" | Ticket sales
! scope="col" colspan="3" | Box office gross revenue
! scope="col" rowspan="2" | Budget
|-
! scope="col" | Japan
! scope="col" | Japan
! scope="col" | United States and Canada
! scope="col" | Other territories
|-
! scope="row" |Dragon Ball: Curse of the Blood Rubies| rowspan="16" | 50,000,000
| rowspan="16" | 
| rowspan="2" 
| rowspan="2" 
| rowspan="18" 
|-
! scope="row" |Dragon Ball: Sleeping Princess in Devil's Castle|-
! scope="row" |Dragon Ball: Mystical Adventure| 
|
|-
! scope="row" |Dragon Ball Z: Dead Zone| 
| 
|-
! scope="row" |Dragon Ball Z: The World's Strongest| 
| $1,009,767
|-
! scope="row" |Dragon Ball Z: The Tree of Might| rowspan="5" 
| rowspan="12" 
|-
! scope="row" |Dragon Ball Z: Lord Slug|-
! scope="row" |Dragon Ball Z: Cooler's Revenge|-
! scope="row" |Dragon Ball Z: The Return of Cooler|-
! scope="row" |Dragon Ball Z: Super Android 13!|-
! scope="row" |Dragon Ball Z: Broly – The Legendary Super Saiyan| $658,982
|-
! scope="row" |Dragon Ball Z: Bojack Unbound| rowspan="3" 
|-
! scope="row" |Dragon Ball Z: Broly – Second Coming|-
! scope="row" |Dragon Ball Z: Bio-Broly|-
! scope="row" |Dragon Ball Z: Fusion Reborn| $540,707
|-
! scope="row" |Dragon Ball Z: Wrath of the Dragon| rowspan="2" 
|-
! scope="row" |Dragon Ball: The Path to Power| 
| 
|-
! scope="row" |Dragon Ball Z: Battle of Gods|2,340,000
| 
| $2,800,000
| 
|-
! scope="row" |Dragon Ball Z: Resurrection 'F
|2,810,000
| 
| $8,408,363
| 
| $5,000,000
|-
! scope="row" |Dragon Ball Super: Broly|3,070,000
| 
| $30,712,119
| 
| $8,500,000
|-
! scope="row" |Dragon Ball Super: Super Hero|1,770,000
| 
| $35,257,492
| $25,737,000
|
|-
! Anime regional total
! 58,930,000
! 
! 
! +
! rowspan="2" | +
|-
! Anime worldwide total
!
! colspan="3" | 
|-
|}

 Home video sales 
{| class="wikitable sortable plainrowheaders" style="text-align:center;"
! scope="col" | Film
! scope="col" | Japan 
! scope="col" | Japan 
! scope="col" | United States 
|-
! scope="row" |Dragon Ball: Curse of the Blood Rubies| 25,000
| 
| rowspan="15" | 
|-
! scope="row" |Dragon Ball: Sleeping Princess in Devil's Castle| 21,000
| 
|-
! scope="row" |Dragon Ball: Mystical Adventure| 24,000
| 
|-
! scope="row" |Dragon Ball Z: Dead Zone| 28,000
| 
|-
! scope="row" |Dragon Ball Z: The World's Strongest| 33,000
| 
|-
! scope="row" |Dragon Ball Z: The Tree of Might| 38,000
| 
|-
! scope="row" |Dragon Ball Z: Lord Slug| 42,000
| 
|-
! scope="row" |Dragon Ball Z: Cooler's Revenge| 38,000
| 
|-
! scope="row" |Dragon Ball Z: The Return of Cooler| 42,000
| 
|-
! scope="row" |Dragon Ball Z: Super Android 13!| 43,000
| 
|-
! scope="row" |Dragon Ball Z: Broly – The Legendary Super Saiyan| 40,000
| 
|-
! scope="row" |Dragon Ball Z: Bojack Unbound| 37,000
| 
|-
! scope="row" |Dragon Ball Z: Broly – Second Coming| 36,000
| 
|-
! scope="row" |Dragon Ball Z: Bio-Broly| 29,000
| 
|-
! scope="row" |Dragon Ball Z: Fusion Reborn| 25,000
| 
|-
! scope="row" |Dragon Ball Z: Wrath of the Dragon| 9,610
| 
| $4,770,466
|-
! scope="row" |Dragon Box: The Movies| 59,800
| 
| 
|-
! scope="row" |Dragonball Evolution| 25,012
| 
| $8,316,099
|-
! scope="row" |Dragon Ball Z: Battle of Gods| 
| 
| $491,534
|-
! scope="row" |Dragon Ball Z: Resurrection 'F'| 
| 
| $8,083,129
|-
! scope="row" |Dragon Ball Super: Broly|
| 
| $12,395,369
|-
! Regional total
! 812,775
! 
! $34,056,597+
|-
! Worldwide total
!
! colspan="2" | +
|}

 Critical response 
{| class="wikitable sortable plainrowheaders"
! scope="col" | Film
! scope="col" | Rotten Tomatoes
! scope="col" | Metacritic
|-
! scope="row" |Dragonball Evolution| 15%
| 45/100
|-
! scope="row" |Dragon Ball Z: Battle of Gods| 88%
| 
|-
! scope="row" |Dragon Ball Z: Resurrection 'F'| 83%
| 
|-
! scope="row" |Dragon Ball Super: Broly| 83%
| 59/100
|}

 Notes 

 References 

 External links 
 Dragon Ball'' on IMDb

 
Films
Dragon Ball
Dragon Ball
20th Century Studios franchises
Dragon Ball